Billy Askew (born 2 October 1959 in Great Lumley (near Durham), England) is an English footballer best known for his career with Hull City.

Askew attended Lord Lawson school in Birtley and began his career with Middlesbrough before joining Hull in 1982. A left-footed midfield dynamo, he was an integral part of the side's rise from the Fourth to Second Division in the 80s before leaving for Newcastle United in 1990. After a loan spell at Shrewsbury Town, he moved to Gateshead.

In 1994, he moved to Waterford United where he made 3 appearances.

After retiring from playing he was a publican in Hull. He is currently connected to the coaching staff at Darlington F.C.

External links

References

English footballers
Middlesbrough F.C. players
Hull City A.F.C. players
Newcastle United F.C. players
Waterford F.C. players
Gateshead F.C. players
English Football League players
League of Ireland players
Living people
1959 births
Association football midfielders